Põhja-Sakala Parish is a rural municipality in Viljandi County.

Settlements
Towns
Suure-Jaani, Võhma

Boroughs
Kõpu, Olustvere

Villages
Aimla, Ängi, Arjadi, Arjassaare, Arussaare, Epra, Iia, Ilbaku, Ivaski, Jälevere, Jaska, Kabila, Kangrussaare, Kärevere, Karjasoo, Kerita, Kibaru, Kildu, Kirivere, Kobruvere, Kõidama, Koksvere, Kõo, Kootsi, Kuhjavere, Kuiavere, Kuninga, Kurnuvere, Laane, Lahmuse, Lemmakõnnu, Lõhavere, Loopre, Maalasti, Mäeküla, Metsküla, Mudiste, Munsi, Navesti, Nuutre, Paaksima, Paelama, Paenasti, Pilistvere, Punaküla, Põhjaka, Päraküla, Rääka, Reegoldi, Riiassaare, Sandra, Saviaugu, Seruküla, Soomevere, Supsi, Sürgavere, Tääksi, Taevere, Tällevere, Tipu, Uia, Ülde, Unakvere, Vanaveski, Vastemõisa, Venevere, Vihi, Võhmassaare, Võivaku, Võlli,

Religion

References